Agon (translation from Belarusian: Fire) is a Ukrainian-based pop boyband from Ukraine made up of Anton Savlepov, Konstantine Borovski and Nikita Goryuk. Assembled in Kyiv in 2016 by former members of Quest Pistols Show, the group has released one album and several singles so far. In November 2017 the three most popular music videos of «Agon» had a total of over 20 million views on YouTube.

Overview

The band was formed by three former members of the Ukrainian pop band Quest Pistols Show Anton Savlepov (born 1988), Konstantine Borovski (born 1981) and Nikita Goryuk (born 1985) in January 2016 after they had collaborated from 2007 in the previous band whose music videos had tens of millions of views.

Music and lyrics

The author of both music and lyrics of both «Agon» and its predecessor «Quest Pistols» is Sasha Chemerov whose own former Ukrainian band Dymna Sumish (1998-2012) and present US band The Gitas performed grunge. Despite Sasha Chemerov always singing in Ukrainian and English, the language of songs of «Agon» is Russian.

Other facts

Name

The name of the band «Agon» is a Russian word for fire written with help of Phonemic orthography (written as it sounds) - but in fact, the Belarusian word for fire (Агонь) was got.

Stance regarding Russia-Ukraine war

Despite Ukrainian Parliament in January 2015 recognised Russia as aggressor state, «Agon» several times gave concerts in Russia mainly in Moscow

Lifestyle 

All three members of «Agon» are vegetarians from no later than 2005 and they made this choice under influence of their songwriter Sasha Chemerov

Discography

Studio albums

 #Ябудулюбитьтебя (2016), Warner (translation from Russian: #Iwillloveyou)

Music videos

References

External links 
 «Agon» on YouTube
 «Agon» on Instagram
 «Agon» on Facebook

Discographies of Ukrainian artists
2016 establishments in Ukraine
House music groups
Musical groups established in 2016
Ukrainian pop music groups
Male dancers